Williams Grove School is a historic one-room school located at Angier, Harnett County, North Carolina. It was built in 1892, and is a one-room frame front gable building.  It measures 30 feet, 4 inches long, by 22 feet, 4 inches wide.  It was moved to its present site in 1975 and subsequently restored as a museum.

It was listed on the National Register of Historic Places in 1995.

References

Schools in North Carolina
One-room schoolhouses in North Carolina
School museums
School buildings on the National Register of Historic Places in North Carolina
School buildings completed in 1892
Museums in Harnett County, North Carolina
National Register of Historic Places in Harnett County, North Carolina